Little Henny is a locality and civil parish near Sudbury, in the Braintree district, in the county of Essex, England. Little Henny is located in between Great Henny and Bulmer Tye. Unusually for a civil parish in the area, it has no church - though the foundations of a medieval church exist. With its very small population, the "village" comprises just a few houses, with no public house or shops.

Further reading 
 Listed buildings in Little Henny
 History of Little Henny

Villages in Essex
Civil parishes in Essex
Braintree District